The 1995 Laurie O'Reilly Cup was the second edition of the competition and was held on 22nd July at Auckland.
New Zealand retained the O'Reilly Cup after defeating Australia 64–0.

Match

References 

Laurie O'Reilly Cup
Australia women's national rugby union team
New Zealand women's national rugby union team
Laurie O'Reilly Cup